"Curtain Falls" is a song by English boy band Blue. The song was co-written by the band and StarGate, who produced the track. Stevie Wonder is also credited as a writer due to the sampling of his 1976 song "Pastime Paradise". "Curtain Falls" was released on 8 November 2004 as the first single from Blue's first greatest hits album, Best of Blue (2004). Commercially, it peaked at number two in Italy, number four in the United Kingdom, and number eight in Germany. In France, the song was re-recorded in French and re-titled "Quand le rideau tombe"; although it was released as a single there, only the English version charted.

Track listings
UK CD1
 "Curtain Falls" (album version)
 "Best of Blue Medley"

UK CD2
 "Curtain Falls" (album version) – 4:03
 "Long Time" – 4:14
 "Too Close" (Blacksmith R&B club rub) – 5:41

French CD single
 "Curtain Falls" – 3:38
 "Quand le rideau tombe" – 3:20
 "Curtain Falls" (video) – 3:58

Credits and personnel
Credits are taken from the Best of Blue album booklet.

Studios
 Mixed at StarGate Studios (Norway)
 Mastered at Alchemy Mastering and 360 Mastering (London, England)

Personnel

 Stevie Wonder – writing
 StarGate – production
 Mikkel S. Eriksen – writing, instruments
 Hallgeir Rustan – writing, instruments
 Tor Erik Hermansen – writing, instruments
 Antony Costa – writing
 Duncan James – writing
 Lee Ryan – writing
 Simon Webbe – writing
 John Davis – mastering (Alchemy)
 Dick Beetham – mastering (360)

Charts

Weekly charts

Year-end charts

References

2004 singles
2004 songs
Blue (English band) songs
Innocent Records singles
Song recordings produced by Stargate (record producers)
Songs written by Hallgeir Rustan
Songs written by Lee Ryan
Songs written by Mikkel Storleer Eriksen
Songs written by Simon Webbe
Songs written by Stevie Wonder
Songs written by Tor Erik Hermansen
Virgin Records singles